Gourits River, sometimes spelled 'Gouritz River', is situated in the Western Cape, South Africa.

The Gourits River flows from the confluence of the Gamka River and Olifants River and is joined by the Groot River, before flowing through the Langeberg Mountains and coastal plain. It eventually drains into the sea through the Gourits Estuary near Gouritsmond.

See also 
 List of rivers of South Africa
 List of estuaries of South Africa
 List of reservoirs and dams in South Africa

References

Rivers of the Western Cape